The Saturn V-ELV was to be an enlarged Saturn V with the addition of four Titan UA1207 solid rocket boosters derived from the Titan IV launch vehicle and liquid propellant stages derived from the conceptual Saturn MLV-V-4(S)-A* and MLV-V-1A. Had it been built it would have been able to put a 200,000 kg payload into low Earth orbit or a 67,000 kg payload into a translunar trajectory.

Vehicle Layout 

V ELV